Irena Matović (born 23 May 1988) is a Montenegrin basketball player for Enea AZS Poznań and the Montenegrin national team.

She participated at the EuroBasket Women 2017.

References

External links
Profile at eurobasket.com

1988 births
Living people
Montenegrin women's basketball players
ŽKK Vojvodina players
ŽKK Partizan players
Shooting guards
People from Bar, Montenegro
Montenegrin expatriate basketball people in Serbia
Montenegrin expatriate basketball people in Poland
Montenegrin expatriate basketball people in Hungary
Montenegrin expatriate sportspeople in Israel
Montenegrin expatriate basketball people in Romania
Montenegrin expatriate sportspeople in France